The fifth and final season of the AMC television series Hell on Wheels premiered on July 18, 2015 and comprised 14 episodes. The season was evenly split; the first half aired in late 2015, and the second half aired in mid-2016. This season, set in California and Laramie, Wyoming, focused on the race to complete America's First transcontinental railroad, as Cullen Bohannon switched from working with the Union Pacific to the Central Pacific Railroad, upon the CP developer's promise to help find Cullen's family.

Cast

Main cast
The fifth season features 13 series regulars; with Tim Guinee, Byron Mann, Reg Rogers, Angela Zhou, and Chelah Horsdal added to the main cast.

 Anson Mount as Cullen Bohannon, a former Confederate soldier, who worked with the Union Pacific Railroad but switched to the Central Pacific, upon Collis Huntington's promise to help find Cullen's family (13 episodes)
 Colm Meaney as Thomas C. Durant, whose Union Pacific railroad is in a race to lay more track than the rival Central Pacific (10 episodes)
 Christopher Heyerdahl as Thor "The Swede" Gundersen, who works for both Cullen and the Mormons and, yet, still maintains a hidden agenda (8 episodes)
 Robin McLeavy as Eva, a former Indian captive and prostitute, turned madam for Mickey McGinnes (9 episodes)
 Jennifer Ferrin as Louise Ellison, a journalist and editor of The Cheyenne Leader newspaper, who investigates the swindling of the railroad (7 episodes)
 Phil Burke as Mickey McGinnes, the owner of a casino and whorehouse, and Mayor of Cheyenne (8 episodes)
 Dohn Norwood as Psalms Jackson, head of a skeleton crew of Freedmen who are pressured to beat the Union Pacific's rivals (5 episodes)
 Tim Guinee as Collis Huntington, developer of the Central Pacific Railroad and Cullen's new employer (10 episodes)
 Byron Mann as Chang, labor contractor for the Central Pacific Railroad (9 episodes)
 Reg Rogers as James Strobridge, construction superintendent for the Central Pacific Railroad (8 episodes)
 MacKenzie Porter as Naomi Hatch Bohannon, Cullen Bohannon's wife, who struggles to build a new life, family, and home and is awakening her own desire to experience adventures beyond the Mormon fort (4 episodes)
 Angela Zhou as Fong/Mei, a Chinese worker for the Central Pacific Railroad. Originally disguised as Tao's son, Fong, she is discovered by Cullen to be a woman named Mei. (9 episodes)
 Chelah Horsdal as Maggie Palmer, the richest woman in Cheyenne and owner of the Palmer Hotel, who is often at odds with Durant (5 episodes)

Recurring cast
 Josh Caras as Phineas Howe Young, Brigham Young's son, who leads the Mormon work crew under the influence of Thor Gundersen (7 episodes)
 Tzi Ma as Tao, head of the Chinese crew for the Central Pacific Railroad (6 episodes)
 Andrew Howard as Johnny Shea, Mickey's Irish cousin from New York, who is made railroad foreman (3 episodes)
 Jennifer Lim as Wai-Ling, Chang's enslaved wife who works in his brothel (3 episodes)
 Amber Chardae Robinson as Mary Fields, stagecoach driver (3 episodes)
 Victor Slezak as President Ulysses S. Grant (3 episodes)
 Jake Weber as John Allen Campbell, a former Brigadier General for the Union Army, appointed provisional governor of Wyoming by Ulysses S. Grant. Campbell is determined to civilize the West and seize control of the city from railroad mogul Durant. (3 episodes)
 Gregg Henry as Brigham Young, the leader of the Mormons (2 episodes)
 Toby Hemingway as Isaac Vinson, a farmhand for the Hatches. In Cullen's absence, Naomi has fallen in love with him. (2 episodes)
 Andy Yu as Hoi, a Chinese worker who was the first to give his life for the railroad after Cullen's decision to switch from traditional gunpowder to nitroglycerin. (2 episodes)

Production
On November 7, 2014, AMC renewed Hell On Wheels for a fifth and final season, consisting of 14 episodes, which premiered July 18, 2015. AMC also announced the season would be split into two parts, with half the episodes to air in 2015 and the other half beginning July 2016. About the season, showrunner John Wirth stated: "The end of the story is written down in history, so we know how the story would end for the railroad." He added: "What we didn't know is how the story would end for each of our characters, especially the ones that we created. It's been really challenging to wrap up people's stories in a satisfying way [...] We've gone down a lot of blind alleys and we've taken a lot of wrong turns and we've lost our way. Now, we've kind of clawed our way back to what I think is going to be a pretty good wrap up for the series."

The fifth season's production filming took place on the CL Ranch, west of Calgary, for the Truckee, California, and Laramie, Wyoming, locations. The Kananaskis Country park system, 40 miles west of the ranch, serves as the Sierra Nevada mountains the Central Pacific Railroad must cross.

Episodes

The finale was followed by two additional bonus specials, on July 24, 2016, on AMC, titled "Series Wrap-Up" and "Inside the Final Episode".

References

External links 
 
 

Fiction set in 1867
Fiction set in 1868
Fiction set in 1869
2015 American television seasons
2016 American television seasons
Hell on Wheels (TV series)
 
Split television seasons